Turnayolu is a village in the Nazımiye District, Tunceli Province, Turkey. The village is populated by Kurds of the Kurêşan tribe and had a population of 53 in 2021.

The hamlets of Bıçkılı, Boncuk, Dipdere and Yoncalı are attached to the village.

References 

Villages in Nazımiye District
Kurdish settlements in Tunceli Province